This is a list of the National Register of Historic Places listings in Karnes County, Texas.

This is intended to be a complete list of properties and districts listed on the National Register of Historic Places in Karnes County, Texas. There are one district and two individual properties listed on the National Register in the county. One individually listed property is also a State Antiquities Landmark while the district contains several Recorded Texas Historic Landmarks.

Current listings

The locations of National Register properties and districts may be seen in a mapping service provided.

|}

See also

National Register of Historic Places listings in Texas
Recorded Texas Historic Landmarks in Karnes County

References

External links

Karnes County, Texas
Karnes County
Buildings and structures in Karnes County, Texas